Tapirus is a genus of tapir which contains the three living American tapir species. They are native to the Americas. The Malayan tapir is usually included in Tapirus as well, although some authorities have moved it into its own genus, Acrocodia.

Extant species

The Kabomani tapir was at one point recognized as another living member of the genus, but is now considered to be nested within T. terrestris.

Evolution
Tapirus first appeared in the Late Miocene in North America, with Tapirus webbi perhaps the oldest known fossil species.

Tapirus spread into South America and Eurasia during the Pliocene. It has been suggested that the tapirs that inhabited North America during the Late Pleistocene may be derived from a South American species that remigrated north, perhaps Tapirus cristatellus.

Tapirs suffered large-scale extinctions at the end of the Pleistocene, and went completely extinct north of southern Mexico.

Fossil species
†Tapirus arvernensis Croizet & Jobert, 1828
†Tapirus augustus Matthew & Granger, 1923 - Formerly Megatapirus  
†Tapirus californicus Merriam, 1912 
†Tapirus copei Simpson, 1945
†Tapirus cristatellus Winge, 1906 
†Tapirus greslebini Rusconi, 1934
†Tapirus johnsoni Schultz et al., 1975
†Tapirus lundeliusi Hulbert, 2010
†Tapirus merriami Frick, 1921
†Tapirus mesopotamicus Ferrero & Noriega, 2007 
†Tapirus oliverasi Ubilla, 1983  - Invalid
†Tapirus polkensis Olsen, 1860 
†Tapirus rioplatensis Cattoi, 1957 
†Tapirus rondoniensis Holanda et al., 2011
†Tapirus sanyuanensis Huang & Fang, 1991
†Tapirus simpsoni Schultz et al., 1975
†Tapirus sinensis Owen, 1870
†Tapirus tarijensis Ameghino, 1902
†Tapirus veroensis Sellards, 1918 
†Tapirus webbi Hulbert, 2005

References

Mammal genera
Taxa named by Mathurin Jacques Brisson
Tapirs